Queenstown is a hamlet in southern Alberta, Canada within Vulcan County.

Climate

Demographics 

The population of Queenstown according to the 2007 municipal census conducted by Vulcan County is 8.

See also 
List of communities in Alberta
List of hamlets in Alberta

References 

Hamlets in Alberta
Vulcan County